Novosphingobium aquaticum  is a Gram-negative, rod-shaped, strictly aerobic and non-motile bacterium from the genus Novosphingobium which has been isolated from lake water in Suwon in Korea.

References

External links
Type strain of Novosphingobium aquaticum at BacDive -  the Bacterial Diversity Metadatabase	

Acidophiles
Bacteria described in 2013
Sphingomonadales